The Dali Kingdom, also known as the Dali State (Bai: Dablit Guaif), was a state situated in modern Yunnan province, China from 937 until 1253. In 1253, it was conquered by the Mongols but members of its former ruling dynasty continued to administer the area as tusi chiefs under the auspices of the Yuan dynasty until the Ming conquest of Yunnan in 1382. Today the former capital of the Dali Kingdom is still called Dali in modern Yunnan Province.

Name
The Dali Kingdom takes its name from Dali City. Famed for its high quality marble, Dali (dàlǐ 大理) literally means "marble" in Chinese.

History

Origins 
Nanzhao was overthrown in 902 and three dynasties followed in quick succession before Duan Siping seized power in 937, establishing himself at Dali. The Duan clan professed to have Han ancestry. Yuan dynasty records said the Duan family came from Wuwei in Gansu:

Relations with the Song dynasty 
Dali's relationship with the Song was cordial throughout its entire existence. Dali congratulated the Song dynasty on the conquest of Later Shu in 965 and voluntarily established tribute relations in 982. It was however essentially an independent state. At times the Song even declined offers of tribute. The Song founder Song Taizu declared all land south of the Dadu River to be Dali territory and did not desire to pursue any further claims to avoid the Tang dynasty's disastrous efforts against Nanzhao.

Dali's primary importance to the Song dynasty was its horses, which were highly prized and sought after as military assets, especially after the fall of the Northern Song. They were described by a Song official in the following passage:

Dazhong Kingdom (1094-1096) 
In 1094, the former prime minister Gao Shengtai forced King Duan Zhengming to relinquish the throne to him and renamed the Dali Kingdom to "Dazhong Kingdom". Gao Shengtai ruled briefly until his death in 1096, after which the throne was returned to the Duan family. Duan Zhengming's younger brother, Duan Zhengchun, became the new ruler and restored the kingdom's former name.

Intervention in Đại Việt 
According to a Vietnamese stone inscription, in 1096 a Dali magician was said to have plotted a conspiracy to murder King Lý Nhân Tông. After the death of Nhân Tông in 1127, his adopted son (by concubine) named Zhizhi had escaped to Dali, changed his surname to Zhao, and assumed the title pingwang (peaceful king). When he learned that his older brother, King Lý Thần Tông, had died in 1137, Zhizhi returned to Đại Việt and attacked Lý Anh Tông with 3,000 Dali troops. However, he was defeated and executed.

Fall 

In 1252 Möngke Khan placed his brother Kublai in charge of invading Dali. In 1253 Kublai's army crossed the Jinsha River and received the surrender of Duan Xingzhi, who presented to Möngke in 1256 maps of Yunnan. Duan Xingzhi of Dali was enfeoffed as Maharaja (摩诃罗嵯) by Kublai Khan, and the Duan imperial family continued to hold the title of Maharaja in Yunnan as vassals to the Mongols under the supervision of Borjigin imperial princes and Muslim governors. The Duan family reigned in Dali while the governors served in Kunming. After the Ming conquest of Yunnan, the members of the Duan clan were scattered in various distant areas of China by the Hongwu Emperor.

Yunnan under the Yuan dynasty 
The Duan family governed Yunnan's various indigenous peoples for eleven generations until the end of Mongol rule. They willingly contributed soldiers to the Mongol campaign against the Song dynasty. In 1271, they aided the Yuan dynasty in putting down a Mongol rebellion in Yunnan.

In 1274, Ajall Shams al-Din Omar was assigned by Kublai to stabilize Yunnan. He instituted a native chieftain system that came to be known as tusi which assigned ranks and posts to native chieftains. Under this institution of "rule based on native customs" the locals retained much of their autonomy with the exception of three obligations. One, they would provide surrendered troops to the Yuan government. Two, local chieftains would provide tribute to the Yuan court. Three, they would follow the rules of appointment, succession, promotion, degradation, reward, and punishment of native chieftains created by the Yuan court.

Yuan rule also introduced a significant Muslim influence into Yunnan.

The King of Dali Duan Gong was married to the Mongol Borjigin princess Agai, daughter of the Yuan dynasty Prince of Liang, Basalawarmi. They had a son and a daughter,
Duan Sengnu. their children were also called Duan Qiangna and Duan Bao. However the Mongols feared the power of Duan Gong and killed him. Duan Sengnu raised Duan Bao to take revenge against Basalawarmi for the killing of Duan Gong. A play was made based on these events. According to Yuan documents, the Duan family were originally ethnic Han from Wuwei commandery, Gansu. Other Duan families also originated from Wuwei.

Conquest of Yunnan by the Ming dynasty 

In 1381, the Ming dynasty dispatched 300,000 troops to crush the Yuan remnants in Yunnan.

The Duan clan, who helped the Yuan dynasty against a Red Turban Rebellion attack from Sichuan, also fought against the Ming army. Duan Gong refused to surrender by writing to Fu Youde, making it clear that Dali could only be a tributary to the Ming. Fu Youde attacked and crushed Duan Gong's realm after a fierce battle. The Duan brothers were taken captive and escorted back to the Ming capital.

Government 
Under the influence of Chinese officials present from early times, the Dali elite used Chinese script supplemented by Bai characters, which were themselves constructed based on Chinese characters. The Dali court granted hereditary fiefs to pre-existing clan chiefs, in particular the Duan, Gao, Yang, and Dong clans, to win over their support. Some administrative units were designated semi-autonomous military divisions. Similarly to the Nanzhao military, the Dali military consisted of a standing army, townsfolk peasant-soldiers and indigenous militia.

Language and ethnicity

Extant sources from Nanzhao and the Dali Kingdom show that the ruling elite used Chinese script. The vast majority of Dali sources are written in Classical Chinese. However the ruling elite also used Bai language for communication, but no attempt was made to standardize or popularize the script, and it remained an unofficial writing system.

Today, most Bai people trace their ancestry to Nanzhao and the Dali Kingdom, but records from those kingdoms do not mention the Bai. The earliest references to "Bai people", or the "Bo", are from the Yuan dynasty.  During the Ming dynasty, the Bai were also known as "Minjia" (civilians). A Bai script using Chinese characters was mentioned during the Ming dynasty.

According to Stevan Harrell, while the ethnic identity of Nanzhao's ruling elite is still disputed, the subsequent Yang and Duan dynasties were both definitely Bai.

Religion
A version of Buddhism known as Azhali existed in Yunnan since the 9th century. The last king of Nanzhao established Buddhism as the state religion and many Dali kings continued the tradition. Ten of Dali's 22 kings retired to become Buddhist monks.

Fan Chengda (1126-1193) encountered a Dali trade mission and noted that they sought Chinese literature, medical texts, Buddhist scriptures, and dictionaries in return for horses. He marveled that "these people all possessed proper etiquette, and carried and recited Buddhist scriptural books."

Gallery

Family tree of monarchs

Art

Gallery

Citations

References

External links 
 

937 establishments
10th-century establishments in China
1253 disestablishments in Asia
13th-century disestablishments in China
Former countries in Chinese history
Bai people
Dali Kingdom
Former monarchies